William Berners (10 July 1709 - 13 September 1783) was an English property developer and slave owner in the 18th century. He is particularly associated with the development of the Fitzrovia area north of Oxford Street in central London; Berners Street was named after him.

Life
William Berners was born in 1709, a son of William Berners and Elizabeth Rawworth, in Much Hadham, Hertfordshire.

William Berners snr was a grandson of Josias Berners, a Clerkenwell resident and lawyer who had interests in the New River Company and bought land in a district then known as Newlands west of the City of London. Josias' son James and William snr (who died in 1712, when William jnr was an infant) undertook some development of the area during the late 17th century.

Once William Berners came of age, he was able to start developing land which had hitherto been used for gardening. In 1738 he made an agreement with a Thomas Huddle to develop an area measuring 655 ft long by 100 ft deep fronting on to Oxford Street. Initially, three streets - Newman, Berners and Wells Streets - were created.

After earlier piecemeal development, Berners undertook systematic development of what is now Fitzrovia between 1758 and 1772. Concerted development of the Berners estate included the creation of Charles and Suffolk (now Nassau) Streets and various mews between the main north–south streets.

Through his marriage to Mary Bendysh, he became a co-owner of the Wagwater estate in St Mary, Jamaica in 1760.

Berners acquired extensive landholdings on the Shotley Peninsula south of Ipswich in Suffolk and commissioned Leicestershire architect John Johnson to design a fashionable gentleman's country residence, Woolverstone Hall, in 1776. Johnson had previously designed various buildings for Berners in London.

References

1709 births
1783 deaths
English businesspeople